Villalba may refer to:

People
Darío Villalba (born 1939), Spanish painter
Héctor Villalba (born 1994), Argentine footballer who plays for Atlanta United in Major League Soccer
Jason Villalba, member of the Texas House of Representatives from Dallas
Mercedes Villalba, British politician

Places
Italy
Villalba, Sicily, a comune in the Province of Caltanissetta

Puerto Rico
 Villalba, Puerto Rico, a municipio in the Commonwealth of Puerto Rico
 Villalba Abajo, a barrio in Puerto Rico
 Villalba Arriba, a barrio in Puerto Rico
 Villalba barrio-pueblo, a downtown and seat in Villalba, Puerto Rico

Spain
Collado Villalba, a municipio in the Community of Madrid
Vilalba, a municipio in the Province of Lugo, Galicia
Villalba de la Loma, a municipio in the Province of Valladolid, Castille and León
Villalba de los Alcores, a municipio in the Province of Valladolid, Castille and León
Villalba de los Barros, a municipio in the Province of Badajoz, Extremadura
Villalba de Rioja, a municipio in the Autonomous Community of La Rioja
Villalba del Rey, a municipio in the Province of Cuenca, Castile-La Mancha
Villalbilla, a municipio in the Community of Madrid

Venezuela
Villalba, Nueva Esparta, a municipio in the State of Nueva Esparta